Dangerous Crossing is a 1953 American film noir mystery film directed by Joseph M. Newman and starring Jeanne Crain and Michael Rennie, based on the 1943 play Cabin B-13 by John Dickson Carr. The plot of the film centers on the gaslighting of a female protagonist aboard a cruise vessel.

Plot
Newlywed Ruth (Stanton) Bowman (Jeanne Crain) joyously starts a honeymoon cruise to Europe with her husband John Bowman (Carl Betz), only to have him go missing shortly after they check into their cabin. Compounding her confusion, Ruth finds that she is registered solo under her maiden name in a different cabin and that none of the crew members who could have seen her husband on the ship remember him. These include the ship's purser (Gayne Whitman), stewardess Anna Quinn (Mary Anderson), and second officer Jim Logan (Max Showalter). After she talks to the captain (Willis Bouchey), he orders the ship searched for the missing John Bowman. However, the captain notices that Ruth isn't wearing a wedding ring, and the crew begin to suspect Ruth is mentally unbalanced.

That night, John telephones Ruth with a cryptic warning not to trust anyone. A divorcee traveling solo (Marjorie Hoshelle) and the stewardess take an interest in Ruth. Meanwhile, Dr. Manning (Michael Rennie) starts a sympathetic search for the facts, spends time with Ruth, using his clinical demeanour to get her to open up about the recent death of her father, a wealthy steel executive.

Ruth recognizes the crew question her sanity, and decides to put on an act and agrees that she's been foolish, but mysterious things continue to happen. Ruth and Dr. Manning get closer, and a man who walks with a cane seems to stalk her.

The stewardess is revealed as conspiring with someone (by phone) to make Ruth seem unstable. Dr. Manning confronts Ruth with the suggestion that her wedding was either secret or non-existent. She explains that John wanted it to be quick and quiet and talks about an uncle who might scheme to get her large inheritance.

John calls again and asks to meet Ruth on deck but runs into the fog when he hears others approach. The ship's crew chase Ruth but she escapes, ending up in the dance room where she is trapped and makes a scene of despair. The captain demands that she be locked in her cabin. She is sedated and a strict nurse prevents her from demanding anything.

At last, John is revealed to be Barlowe, the third mate, who has been under Dr. Manning's care all along for a claimed illness. When he learns Ruth has been locked in, he tells his co-conspirator the stewardess to enable her escape. When they meet again, John attempts to throw Ruth overboard (mentioning the money of the inheritance he would get as a motive) but is stopped by Dr. Manning, who has followed her. It is John who accidentally goes overboard in the ensuing fight.

Later, Dr. Manning comforts Ruth, and the captain apologizes in the name of all who didn't believe her and explains that the stewardess confessed.

Cast
 Jeanne Crain as Ruth Stanton Bowman
 Michael Rennie as Dr. Paul Manning
 Max Showalter as Jim Logan (as Casey Adams)
 Carl Betz as John Bowman
 Mary Anderson as Anna Quinn
 Marjorie Hoshelle as Kay Prentiss
 Willis Bouchey as Capt. Peters
 Yvonne Peattie as Miss Bridges

Production
The radio play Cabin B-13 was very popular when broadcast in 1943 and had been adapted for TV in 1948.

Film rights were bought by 20th Century Fox, which started production in 1952 under the name Ship Story. Corinne Calvert and Gary Merrill were the original leads. Joseph M. Newman was originally meant to direct a film called The Raid but it was having casting issues and the director was under contract to the studio, so they transferred him to Ship Story.

Eventually the lead roles were assigned to Fox contract stars Jeanne Crain and Michael Rennie. Filming started January 1953.

Joseph Newman later recalled it was "a very low budget picture. At that time Twentieth Century Fox wanted to cut down on costs. But I think it was a good mystery. Crain and Rennie were both delightful people and pleasant to work with."

Reception

Critical response
The film critic for The New York Times gave a lukewarm review, writing

Although it maintains an eerie quality and suspense through the first half of its footage, Dangerous Crossing, which arrived at the Globe yesterday, is only a mildly engrossing adventure ... While sound effects, background music and shipboard sets lend a peculiar fascination to the melodrama, the acting of the cast adds little tautness to the proceedings. As the beleaguered heiress Jeanne Crain is beautiful but not entirely convincing in the role ... Dangerous Crossing, in effect, is intriguing only part of the way.... Thereafter, it is a commonplace trip.

References

External links
 
 
 
 
 
 

1953 crime drama films
1950s mystery films
1953 films
20th Century Fox films
American black-and-white films
American crime drama films
American films based on plays
American mystery films
1950s English-language films
Film noir
Films directed by Joseph M. Newman
Seafaring films
1950s American films